Admiral Boyle may refer to:

Alexander Boyle (1810–1884), British Royal Navy vice admiral
Algernon Boyle (1871–1949), British Royal Navy vice admiral
Courtenay Boyle (1770–1844), British Royal Navy vice admiral
Douglas Boyle (1923–2001), Canadian Forces vice admiral
Edward Courtney Boyle (1883–1967), British Royal Navy rear admiral
Michael E. Boyle (born 1965), U.S. Navy rear admiral
William Boyle, 12th Earl of Cork (1873–1967), British Royal Navy admiral